Zou is a town in western Ivory Coast. It is a sub-prefecture of Bangolo Department in Guémon Region, Montagnes District.

Zou was a commune until March 2012, when it became one of 1126 communes nationwide that were abolished.

In 2021, the population of the sub-prefecture of Zou was 52,864.

Villages
The 14 villages of the sub-prefecture of Zou and their population in 2014 are:

Notes

Sub-prefectures of Guémon
Former communes of Ivory Coast